Noir et Blanc is a 1986 French film written and directed by Claire Devers.

Cast 
Francis Frappat, Antoine
Jacques Martial, Dominique
Catherine Belkhodja, la femme de ménage
Joséphine Fresson, Edith
Benoît Régent, l'hôtelier
Marc Berman, Roland
Isaach de Bankolé

External links

1986 films
French drama films
1980s French-language films
Films directed by Claire Devers
Caméra d'Or winners
1980s French films